{{DISPLAYTITLE:C5H4O2}}
The molecular formula C5H4O2 (molar mass: 96.085 g/mol) may refer to:

 Furfural (2-furaldehyde)
 3-Furaldehyde
 Protoanemonin
 Pyrones
 2-Pyrone
 4-Pyrone

Molecular formulas